The Campeonato Paraense, nicknamed Parazão, is the top flight professional football league in the Brazilian state of Pará. Run by the Federação Paraense de Futebol, the championship is contested between 12 clubs and typically lasts from January to April.

List of champions

Titles by club

Teams in bold stills active.

By city

See also
 Campeonato Paraense Second Division

External links
FPF Official Website

Campeonato Paraense
Paraense